Marking may refer to:

Symbols
Marking may refer to human-made symbols and annotations in several contexts:

On vehicles 
 Aircraft marking
 Emergency vehicle equipment markings
 Battenburg markings, emergency vehicle patterns
 Vehicle markings of the United States military
 Police vehicle markings (US/Canada)
 Sail Class Markings, figures placed on the sail of sailing boats to mark the boat type
 Semi-trailer truck marking lights

On other manufactured goods 
 Card marking, altering playing cards in secret for use in magic tricks or cheating
 Conductor marking lights, power line markers
 Direct part marking, a process to mark parts with product information
 Photographic film markings
 Road surface marking, such as lines or words, or the stripes of a zebra crossing on a road surface
 UID-marking, permanent marking used by the US Department of Defense

Other symbols 
 Grading (education), evaluation of the performance of a student
 Lamb marking, a process of earmarking, castration and tail-docking of the lambs of domestic sheep
 Postal marking, annotation applied to a letter by a postal service
 Road surface marking, such as lines or words, or the stripes of a zebra crossing on a road surface
 Territorial marking, a behavior used by animals to identify their territory
 Trail blazing, marks in outdoor areas that indicate the direction of a trail
 The process of assigning priorities to objects of interest, for the purposes of targeting, surveillance or analysis
 Timber marking, selecting the trees to be cut in a forest stand by marking them with a marking axe

Linguistics
 Marker (linguistics), a free or bound morpheme that indicates the grammatical function of the marked word, phrase, or sentence
 Markedness, the state of standing out as unusual or divergent in comparison to a more common or regular form

People
 Havana Marking, British producer and director of documentary films

Sports
 Marking (association football), assigning a defender to a certain offensive player:
 Man-to-man marking
 Zonal marking
 Mark (Australian football), the action of catching an airborne kicked ball in Australian rules football

Other uses
 Animal markings, such as the spots of a leopard or horse markings
 Lamb marking, a process of earmarking, castration and tail-docking of the lambs of domestic sheep
 Jehovah's Witnesses "marking", withdrawing of close association from a congregant according to Thessalonians 3:14
 Sole markings, a type of sedimentary structure
 Trace evidence, in forensic science
 Vägmärken (Markings), a book by Dag Hammarskjold

See also
 
 
 Marking gauge
 Marking knife
 Marking out
 Marking scheme
 Marking Time (disambiguation)
 Mark (disambiguation)